Horseman, Pass By is a 1961 Western novel by American writer Larry McMurtry. McMurtry's debut novel, it portrays life on a cattle ranch from the perspective of young narrator Lonnie Bannon. Set in Texas in 1954, the Bannon ranch is owned by Lonnie's grandfather, Homer Bannon. Homer's ruthless stepson, Hud, stands as the primary antagonist of the novel. The novel was adapted into the screenplay for the 1963 film Hud, starring Paul Newman as the title character.

The title of the novel derives from the last three lines of the poem "Under Ben Bulben" by William Butler Yeats, which are carved on Yeats’s tombstone:

Plot

Set on a cattle ranch in rural Texas in the early 1950's. Homer Bannon lives with his 17 year old grandson Lonnie, his son Hud and Alma a maternal housekeeper.  Hud is a capable horseman but has a ruthless character. He does not consider others and does what he pleases regardless of consequences.   

The exceptionally beautiful prologue explains Lon's day to day life as he transitioned through his adolescence.

One day, one of Homer's young heifers is found dead. The state veterinarian is call in and has determined that hoof and mouth disease killed the cow.  Consequently the rest of the cattle on the ranch need to be put down to prevent an epidemic. A deep pit was dug by bulldozers. The cattle are shot and buried.

During this time, Hud gets drunk and assaults Alma, causing her to quit her job and leave the ranch. Lonnie who was drawn close to Alma accompanies her to the bus stop to see her off. There Lon encounters Hud and they both drive back to the ranch in separate cars with Lon leading the way.
As they drive through the night, Lonnie spots Homer crawling on the dirt road and stops without warning, causing Hud to rear-end him. Homer is injured and bloody. Hud tells Lonnie to go get help, but Lon won't leave Homers side. Homer passes away quietly in Lons arms. The book ends with Homer's funeral.

References

1961 American novels
Western (genre) novels
Novels by Larry McMurtry
American novels adapted into films
Harper & Brothers books
Novels set in Texas
Fiction set in 1954
1961 debut novels